Tahuantina is a monotypic genus of South American cribellate araneomorph spiders in the family Dictynidae containing the single species, Tahuantina zapfeae. It was first described by Pekka T. Lehtinen in 1967, and has only been found in Chile.

References

Dictynidae
Monotypic Araneomorphae genera
Spiders of South America
Taxa named by Pekka T. Lehtinen
Endemic fauna of Chile